MACC1, MET transcriptional regulator is a protein that in humans is encoded by the MACC1 gene.

Function 

MACC1 is a key regulator of the hepatocyte growth factor (HGF)-HGF receptor (HGFR) pathway, which is involved in cellular growth, epithelial-mesenchymal transition, angiogenesis, cell motility, invasiveness, and metastasis. Expression of MACC1 in colon cancer specimens is an independent prognostic indicator for metastasis formation and metastasis-free survival.

References

Further reading